The discography of P-Square, a Nigerian R&B duo composed of Peter and Paul Okoye, consists of five studio albums, one compilation album, twenty nine singles (including seven as featured artists), and twenty five music videos. Peter & Paul Okoye were raised in Jos, Nigeria. They both joined their school's music and drama club where they began singing, dancing and miming songs by MC Hammer, Bobby Brown and Michael Jackson.

In 1999, Peter and Paul returned to music school to develop their skills on the keyboard, drums, bass and rhythm guitar. Their work includes the soundtracks for a number of films such as Tobi, Mama Sunday, Moment of Bitterness and Evas River.

Albums

Studio albums

Compilation album

Singles

As lead artists

As featured artists

Music videos

As lead artists

As featured artists

Notes 
 "Chop My Money" featuring Akon and May D was co-directed by Ben Marc.
 "Alingo" was co-directed by Clarence Peters.

References 

Discographies of Nigerian artists